"You Keep It All In" is the second single released from English pop rock group  the Beautiful South's debut album, Welcome to the Beautiful South (1989). It reached number eight on the UK Singles Chart in October 1989 and number three in Ireland. "You Keep It All In" was also a hit on American alternative rock radio, peaking at number 19 on the Billboard Modern Rock Tracks chart in early 1990.

Track listings
7-inch, cassette, and mini-CD single
 "You Keep It All In" – 2:52
 "I Love You (But You're Boring)" – 4:28

12-inch and CD single
 "You Keep It All In" – 2:52
 "You Just Can't Smile It Away" – 3:24
 "I Love You (But You're Boring)" – 4:28
 "You Keep It All In" (instrumental) – 2:52

Charts

Weekly charts

Year-end charts

Certifications

References

1989 singles
1989 songs
The Beautiful South songs
Go! Discs singles
Song recordings produced by Mike Hedges
Songs written by David Rotheray
Songs written by Paul Heaton